General elections were held in Malta on 9 May 1987. Although the Nationalist Party received the most votes, the Malta Labour Party won a majority of seats. However, in accordance with the modifications made to the electoral system following a similar outcome in the 1981 elections, the Nationalist Party was awarded an extra four seats in order to give them a parliamentary majority. 

The elections ended 16 years of Labour government, with Nationalist Party Eddie Fenech Adami becoming Prime Minister. Adami stated that he would align the country more closely with Western governments and distance Malta from Muammar Gaddafi.

Results

References

General elections in Malta
Malta
General
Malta